Borough 6 is a northern borough of Düsseldorf, the state capital of North Rhine-Westphalia, Germany. The borough covers an area of 19.63 square kilometres and (as of December 2020) has about 67,000 inhabitants. The borough borders with the Düsseldorf boroughs 1, 2, 5 and 7. To the Northeast the borough borders with the rural district of Mettmann.

Subdivisions 
Borough 6 is made up of four Stadtteile (city parts):

See also 
 Boroughs of Düsseldorf

References

External links 
 Official webpage of the borough 

!